The Most Wuthering Heights Day Ever is an event held at locations around the world where participants recreate the music video for musician Kate Bush's 1978 song "Wuthering Heights". The event's inspiration is Shambush's The Ultimate Kate Bush Experience, which took place in 2013 in Brighton, United Kingdom, as part of Brighton Fringe,  created by performance collective Shambush! who attempted to set an unofficial world record for the most people dressed as Kate Bush in one place, with hundreds attending.

2016

In 2016, The Most Wuthering Heights Day Ever event was proposed to be held in at least 16 places worldwide including Adelaide, Perth, Northern Rivers, Sydney, Tel Aviv, Montreal, Atlanta, Copenhagen, Berlin, Uppsala, Wellington, Hobart, Amsterdam and Somersworth. Shambush! who inspired the event hosted an event in London and helped organise the largest event in Melbourne.

2017
Events were held in Saint Anne's Park, Dublin, Glebe Park, Canberra and Edinburgh Gardens in North Fitzroy, Melbourne, Cairns, and Somersworth.

2018 
2018 Bunbury - The first time held. Gold Coin donations for Soup Van. Facebook group page ‘The Most Wuthering Heights Day Ever -Bunbury’

2018 Newcastle NSW. Held in King Edward Park under the pines since 2016. Hundreds were expected to attend.

2018 Austin, TX USA. Held in Zilker Park; first ever event in Austin.

2018 Brussels, Belgium - first ever.

2018 Melbourne, Vic, Held in Edinburgh Gardens, Fitzroy, near the rotunda.

2018 Copenhagen

2018 Somersworth, NH USA - 3rd annual.

2018 - Cairns, Qld, Australia. 2nd Annual. Held at the Esplanade Lagoon

2019 
Australia: Sydney, Melbourne, Brisbane, Adelaide, Perth, Bunbury, Gold Coast, Newcastle, Blue Mountains, Canberra, Cairns and Bega Valley

Europe: Folkestone and Gorleston-on-Sea (UK), Berlin (Germany), Ghent (Belgium), Paris and Laniscat (France), Dublin (Ireland), Uppsala and Värnamo (Sweden), Oulu (Finland), Copenhagen (Denmark), and Oslo (Norway).

Americas: Atlanta, GA, Austin, TX, Greenfield, MA, Somersworth, NH, (USA), Ottawa and Hamilton (Canada)

Asia: Tel Aviv (Israel), held on 18 May to coincide with Eurovision.

2020 
Americas: Somersworth, NH

Australia: Canberra, Sydney, Cairns

2021 
Americas: Austin TX, Reno NV and Somersworth, NH (USA). Ocotlán, Jalisco (México).

Australia: Adelaide, Bega Valley, Cairns, Melbourne, Brisbane, Bunbury, Canberra, Frankston, Hobart, and Perth.

Europe: Berlin (Germany), Bristol (England), Copenhagen (Denmark), Edinburgh (Scotland), Düsseldorf (Germany), Gorleston-On-Sea (England), Monteveccia (Italy), München (Germany), Langenhahn-Westerwaldkreis (Germany), Sofia (Bulgaria), Mainz (Germany), Nordingrå (Sweden), Phoenix Park (Ireland)

New Zealand: Dunedin, Waiheke Is

2022 
Europe: Cologne, Berlin, Uppsala, Dublin, Edinburgh

Australian: Brisbane, Ballarat

Americas: Atlanta, Georgia, San Diego

References

2016 establishments
Flash mob
Kate Bush